Charles Solomon (1889–1963) was a socialist politician from New York City, elected to the New York State Assembly in 1919 and expelled with four of his fellows on the first day of the legislative session, one week after the sensational Palmer Raids. The case of the "Five Socialist Assemblymen" became a cause célèbre of the Red Scare of 1919-20 and its resolution started the process of curbing war hysteria in the United States.

Biography

Early years
Charles Solomon was born in 1889 and was a resident of Brooklyn, New York.

Political career
Solomon was a member of the New York State Assembly in 1919 and 1920, elected in the 23rd District of Kings County which at that time encompassed East New York, Brooklyn,

At the beginning of the session of 1920, Speaker Thaddeus C. Sweet and the Republican majority suspended Solomon and the other four Socialist members (viz. Louis Waldman, Samuel Orr, August Claessens and Sam DeWitt) for alleged disloyalty due to membership in the Socialist Party of America. A lengthy trial before the Judiciary Committee of the Assembly began in the middle of January. Socialist Party leaders Morris Hillquit and Seymour Stedman were in charge of the defense. During the course of the proceedings, testimony was taken from two New York City policemen who had attempted to stop a crowd of about 2,000 from disrupting a streetcar line in conjunction with a strike in the summer of 1919. According to the published testimony of the officers, on August 6, the two had come across a noisy crowd which had stopped several streetcars by piling debris on the tracks. A near riot erupted when the two plainclothesmen jumped into the fray, one swinging a club and the other punching and kicking. The crowd, for their part, threw rocks and debris at the officers. Assemblyman Solomon, the legislative representative of the district in which the disruption was taking place, was said to have forced his way to the front of the crowd, shouting "Pull the scabs off the cars!" Both officers recognized Solomon and one admonished him for encouraging unlawful behavior and interference. Solomon is said to have moved back into the crowd at this point. Shortly thereafter, reserves arrived and the crowd dispersed and the tracks were cleared. Such testimony proved damning to the cause of the Socialists. On April 1, the five assemblymen were expelled from the House. All five were re-elected at a special election on September 16, and appeared to take their seats at the beginning of the special session on September 20. The next day, DeWitt and Orr were permitted to take their seats, but Claessens, Solomon and Waldman were expelled again. Protesting against the re-expulsion of their comrades, DeWitt and Orr resigned their seats.

Solomon was re-elected to the Assembly in November 1920, and took his seat in the 144th New York State Legislature in January 1921.

Solomon continued to stand as a Socialist candidate for office on many occasions. During the 1920s, he ran for Lieutenant Governor of New York in 1924; for the Assembly again in 1927; and for Justice of the New York Supreme Court in 1928. In the 1930s, he stood for the New York State Senate (8th District) in 1930; for U.S. Senator from New York in 1932; for Mayor of New York City in 1933; for Governor of New York in 1934; and again for the New York Supreme Court in 1938. In December 1935, he took office as a New York City magistrate.

Activity in Socialist Party politics
Solomon was a social democrat, believing in gradualist ameliorative reform and the use of the ballot box rather than relying upon violent seizure of power. In the 1932-36 party controversy, Solomon stood with the "Old Guard" faction headed by Morris Hillquit, James Oneal, and Louis Waldman.

Following its loss on the floor of the Detroit Convention, the SP's Old Guard took its case to the rank and file of the party, which had been called upon to either approve or defeat the new Declaration of Principles in referendum vote. A Committee for the Preservation of the Socialist Party was established and Solomon was called on to write an agitational pamphlet entitled Detroit and the Party. In this polemical piece, Solomon decried the Detroit Declaration of Principles as "reckless," observing pointedly that "furious phrases cannot take the place of organized mass power." Solomon declared that
"The Declaration does not stand by itself, in a vacuum, as it were. Important as it is, it does not alone account for the vital struggle that is now being waged in the party. It represents the culminating point  of a deep seated antagonism. It is like the straw that breaks or threatens to break the camel's back.
"The Declaration of Principles has brought to the surface divergences which are deep, antagonisms which make of our party not a coherent political organization working harmoniously for a common objective but a battle ground of internecine strife."
Solomon charged that the "so-called 'left'" was "making its position clear" with the Declaration of Principles: "There was no mistaking the flag it had unfurled. It was the banner of thinly veiled communism." While he declared that "the Declaration of Principles must be decisively rejected in the referendum," he nevertheless indicated in no uncertain terms that even this would not avert a factional split. "However, that is not enough," he wrote, "The Socialist Party must be made safe for Socialism, for social democracy."

When the resolution passed, the Old Guard immediately set about organizing to lock up the party's New York-based assets under its factional control. The state organization, the Socialist Party of New York, was expelled from the Socialist Party by its governing National Executive Committee in January 1936, and Solomon left with them to help establish the Social Democratic Federation.

Solomon died in 1963.

Footnotes

Works

 The Socialists in the New York Board of Aldermen: A Record of Six Months' Activity with Evans Clark (1918)
  Detroit and the Party (New York: Committee for the Preservation of Socialist Policies, n.d. [1934])

See also
List of New York Legislature members expelled or censured

Further reading

 New York State Legislature, Standing Committee on the Judiciary, Louis M. Martin, Louis Waldman, Samuel Aaron De Witt, August Claessens, Samuel Orr, Charles Solomon, Proceedings of the Judiciary Committee of the Assembly: In The Matter Of The Investigation By The Assembly Of The State Of New York As To The Qualifications Of Louis Waldman, August Claessens, Samuel A DeWitt, Samuel Orr, And Charles Solomon To Retain Their Seats In Said Body. In Three Volumes. New York: J.B. Lyon Co., 1920. Available online: Volume I, Volume II, Volume III.
 Louis Waldman, Albany: The Crisis in Government: The History of the Suspension, Trial and Expulsion from the New York State Legislature in 1920 of the Five Socialist Assemblymen by Their Political Opponents. Introduction by Seymour Stedman. New York: Boni and Liveright, 1920.

1889 births
1963 deaths
Members of the Social Democratic Federation (United States)
Members of the New York State Assembly
Politicians from Brooklyn
Socialist Party of America politicians from New York (state)
Expelled members of the New York State Assembly
20th-century American politicians